Jayson Meyer (born 21 February 1965) is a German-Canadian ice hockey player. He competed for Germany in the men's tournament at the 1994 Winter Olympics.

Career statistics

Regular season and playoffs

International

References

External links

1965 births
Living people
Olympic ice hockey players of Germany
Ice hockey people from Saskatchewan
Ice hockey players at the 1994 Winter Olympics
Sportspeople from Regina, Saskatchewan
Buffalo Sabres draft picks